Bojanice may refer to the following places in Poland:
Bojanice, Lower Silesian Voivodeship (south-west Poland)
Bojanice, Gniezno County in Greater Poland Voivodeship (west-central Poland)
Bojanice, Leszno County in Greater Poland Voivodeship (west-central Poland)